Justice League mainly refers to the Justice League of America, a fictional team of DC Comics superheroes.

Justice League may also refer to:

Media and entertainment
 Justice League (film), a 2017 live-action film based on the team
 Justice League (soundtrack), the soundtrack from the film, by Danny Elfman
 Zack Snyder's Justice League, the director's cut of the original film
 Zack Snyder's Justice League (soundtrack), the soundtrack from the film, by Junkie XL
 Justice League (Smallville), the version of the superhero team in the television series Smallville
 Justice League (TV series), a 2001–2004 animated television series
 Justice League, a 2001 animated television film that served as the television pilot for the series (split into the three-parter series premiere Secret Origins for reruns)
 Justice League Unlimited, a 2004–2006 animated continuation of the series
 Justice League: Crisis on Two Earths, a 2010 direct-to-video animated film
 Justice League: War, a 2014 direct-to-video animated film based on the New 52 Justice League: Origin arc
 Justice League of America (film), a 1997 live-action television pilot and film

Music
 J.U.S.T.I.C.E. League, an American group of hip hop producers

See also
 Justus League, a hip hop collective
 League of the Just, an early Christian communist organization